Ahmadabad (also Romanized as Aḩmadābād) is a village in Kamal Rud Rural District, Qolqol Rud District, Tuyserkan County, Hamadan Province, Iran. At the 2006 census, its population was 317, in 66 families.

References 

Populated places in Tuyserkan County